
Eastern Orthodoxy in France is the totality of all Eastern Orthodox churches in France.

Jurisdictions

Canonical churches

With a local bishop
 Antiochian Orthodox Metropolis of Western and Central Europe (Greek Orthodox Church of Antioch)
 Georgian Orthodox  Eparchy of Saint Nino in Paris (Assembly of Orthodox Bishops of France and Ecumenical Patriarchate of Constantinople)
 Greek Orthodox Metropolis of France (under the Ecumenical Patriarchate of Constantinople)
 Patriarchal Exarchate for Orthodox Parishes of Russian Tradition in Western Europe (Russian Orthodox Church)
 Romanian Orthodox Metropolitanate of Western and Southern Europe (Romanian Orthodox Church)
 Russian Orthodox Diocese of Chersonese (Korsoun) (Russian Orthodox Church)
 Serbian Orthodox Eparchy of Western Europe (Serbian Orthodox Church)
 Diocese of Great Britain and Western Europe (ROCOR)

Without a local bishop
 Bulgarian Orthodox Diocese of Western and Central Europe (Bulgarian Orthodox Church)

Non-canonical churches

With bishop or archbishop
Communion of Western Orthodox Churches
French Orthodox Church
Orthodox Church of the Gauls
Orthodox Church of France

People

Current hierarchs

 Emmanuel (Adamakis) of France
 Gabriel (de Vylder) of Komana
 Luka (Kovacevic) of France and Western Europe

Other major figures

 Eulogius (Georgievsky) of Paris
 Jean-Nectaire (Kovalevsky) of Saint-Denis

Organizations and institutions

Seminary 

 St. Sergius Orthodox Theological Institute (Paris, France)

Monasteries 

 Orthodox Monastery of the Veil of Our Lady (Bussy-en-Othe, France)

Pan-jurisdictional 

 Assembly of Orthodox Bishops of France

See also 
 Religion in France

Sources
OrthodoxWiki:Orthodoxy in France

Literature

External links 
 Assembly of Orthodox Bishops of France, Official Website
 Greek Orthodox Metropolis of France, Official Website
 Patriarchal Exarchate for Orthodox Parishes of Russian Tradition in Western Europe, Official Website
 Russian Orthodox Diocese of Chersonese, Official Website
 Romanian Orthodox Metropolitanate of Western and Southern Europe, Official Website 
 Serbian Orthodox Diocese of France and Western Europe, Official Website
 Bulgarian Orthodox Diocese of Western and Central Europe, Official Website